José Mariano Pulido Solís (22 August 1956 – 2 April 2013) was a Spanish professional footballer who played as a defender.

Club career
Born in Marchena, Province of Seville, Pulido made his professional – and Segunda División – debut with local Sevilla FC at only 17, playing the full 90 minutes in a 4–1 away loss against Gimnàstic de Tarragona on 17 March 1974. He only appeared in a combined eight first-team games in his first two seasons, however, being mainly registered with the reserves.

After three more La Liga campaigns with the Andalusians, Pulido was loaned to second level's Elche CF for 1978–79. Released by his main club in June 1980 after having appeared in a total of 70 official matches, he played three of his final four professional seasons in division two, with CD Castellón and Linares CF.

International career
Pulido represented Spain at the 1976 Summer Olympics in Montreal, appearing in a 0–1 loss against East Germany for an eventual group stage exit.

Later life and death
After retiring, Pulido continued working with Sevilla, mainly as youth coach but also in directorial capacities. He died on 2 April 2013 in Alcalá de Guadaíra due to degenerative disease, at the age of 56.

Pulido's son, Jorge, was also a footballer and a defender. He spent his entire career in the lower leagues.

References

External links

1956 births
2013 deaths
People from Campiña de Morón y Marchena
Sportspeople from the Province of Seville
Spanish footballers
Footballers from Andalusia
Association football defenders
La Liga players
Segunda División players
Segunda División B players
Tercera División players
Sevilla Atlético players
Sevilla FC players
Elche CF players
CD Castellón footballers
Linares CF players
Écija Balompié players
Spain youth international footballers
Spain amateur international footballers
Olympic footballers of Spain
Footballers at the 1976 Summer Olympics
Spanish football managers